NCER may refer to:
National Center for Education Research, part of the Institute of Education Sciences
Northern Corridor Economic Region, a development region in Malaysia